Frederick Hodgson may refer to:

 Frederick Mitchell Hodgson (1851–1928), British colonial administrator
 Frederick Hodgson (politician) (1795–1854), English politician

See also
 Fred Hodgson (disambiguation)